"Genesis" is a song by Canadian singer and songwriter Grimes, released on January 9, 2012 as the lead single from her third studio album, Visions (2012). The song is one of Grimes' most successful releases so far, as a result of the song's music videos becoming viral, mostly through micro-blogging site Tumblr. The NME placed the song at number 16 on its list of 50 Best Tracks of 2012.

Music video
The self-directed video for "Genesis" premiered on August 22, 2012. It was filmed in Los Angeles and co-stars rapper and stripper Brooke Candy, whom Grimes describes as "a very contemporary muse". In the video, Grimes is seen alongside a group of friends while driving an Escalade in the desert, holding an albino python in the back of a limousine, and posing in the woods. She said of the concept of the video: "It's loosely based on this painting by my favorite painter, Hieronymus Bosch, called The Seven Deadly Sins and the Four Last Things. I wanted to play with Medieval/Catholic imagery. I was raised in a Catholic household and went to a Catholic school, and my childhood brain perceived medieval Catholicism as an action movie: There's this crazy omnipresent guy who can destroy you at any moment."

Charts

Certifications

Track listings
Digital download
"Genesis" – 4:15

Limited-edition cassette single
A. "Genesis" – 4:15
B. "Ambrosia" – 3:31

References

2012 debut singles
2012 songs
4AD singles
Grimes songs